Wilsthorpe is the name of a hamlet and two villages in England:

Wilsthorpe, Derbyshire
Wilsthorpe, East Riding of Yorkshire
Wilsthorpe, Lincolnshire

Other
Wilsthorpe Business and Enterprise College is a school in Derbyshire